Trinidad and Tobago is scheduled to compete at the 2023 Pan American Games in Santiago, Chile from October 20 to November 5, 2023. This will be Trinidad and Tobago's 18th appearance at the Pan American Games, having missed only the 1959 edition.

Competitors
The following is the list of number of competitors (per gender) participating at the games per sport/discipline.

Basketball

3x3

Men's tournament

Trinidad and Tobago qualified a men's team (of 4 athletes) by finishing fourth in the 2022 FIBA 3x3 AmeriCup.
Summary

Canoeing

Sprint
Trinidad and Tobago qualified a total of 2 sprint athletes (two men).

Men

Field hockey

Women's tournament

Trinidad and Tobago qualified a women's team of 16 athletes by finishing sixth at the 2022 Pan American Cup.

Summary

References

Nations at the 2023 Pan American Games
2023